Heritage High School is a public four-year high school in the Romoland area of the city of Menifee, California. It is part of the Perris Union High School District. Its first school year began on August 8, 2007, with freshmen and sophomores in attendance. It is primarily fed to by students from the Romoland and Nuview school districts, though some students from the Menifee Union School District also attend. Heritage won their first CIF football championship in 2013, They beat Rancho Verde in a nail bitter the final score was 34 Heritage and 33 Rancho.

References

External links
 

High schools in Riverside County, California
Perris, California
Public high schools in California
Menifee, California
2007 establishments in California